Lovejoy Matare (born 13 September 1991), popularly known by his stage name L kat, is a Zimbabwean hip hop recording artist originally from Kwekwe, Zimbabwe. He records mostly in Shona, his native tongue. In 2005, he released his first single "Wandinoda" as part of his high school compilation album dubbed Manunure High School Mic Fever 1. In 2013, he released his debut studio album Goodlife while signed to Maskiri's record label, Mhondoro Music. The album was supported by the singles "Ndinotya", "Ndiudze", "Tisanyadzise", and "Kupiko". On 6 April 2015, he released an EP album The Golden Episode. The album's singles include "Zita Rako", "My Special Munhu" and "Rudo Ma1". L kat has won several music awards, including multiple Midlands Music Awards and also have been nominated in the Zimbabwe Music Awards.

Early life and music career
L kat was born in Kwekwe, Zimbabwe. In 2005, he decided to pursue a career in music. In 2010, L kat has opened for Oliver "Tuku" Mtukudzi, Winky D, Psyfo, Dj Cndo, Biblos and Andy X in their Kwekwe concerts.

2011: Handaiziva
In February 2011, L kat released Handaiziva, the single which did well on Power FM. The song features POZee.

2012 – present
In May 2012, L kat released "Ndinotya", "Kupiko", "Ndiudze", "Tisanyadzise" as lead singles off the Goodlife album. "Ndinotya", which features Maskiri, was well received throughout Zimbabwe landing him the Song of The Year Award and Best Producer Award at the 2012, Kwekwe Music Awards.

In November 2013, a concert was put together to launch the Goodlife album which received positive reviews from music critics. The album features guest appearances from Maskiri, Diana Samkange, POZee, Goodchild and others. The Goodlife album earned L kat a nomination for Best AfroPop Music at the Zimbabwe Music Awards and also won Best Digital Album at the Midlands Music Awards.

L kat was supposed to release an eight-track album titled Margaret on 28 March 2014. The album leaked before release date forcing L kat and his management to postpone the album release. L kat launched his own record label, Kats Music Group in November 2014. L kat also released "Rudo Ma1" which features Maskiri and The Golden Episode EP album under the label.

On 19 November 2015 L kat received a Nomination for Best Hiphop Music with his single Zita Rako from Zimbabwe Music Awards.

Discography

Studio albums
 Goodlife (2013)

EP albums
 The Golden Episode (2014)

Philanthropy and Humanitarian Initiatives

L kat is generally recognized as one of the most prolific philanthropists to ever come out of the Zimbabwean music industry.

Using the influence he has in the Zimbabwean community as a multi-award winning musician, L kat positively impacted lives of thousands of youths through campaigns and outreach efforts focusing on serious social issues such as drug abuse, HIV/AIDS among others.

Awards and nominations

References

1991 births
Living people
Zimbabwean rappers
Zimbabwean record producers
People from Kwekwe
21st-century Zimbabwean people